"Acceptable in the 80s" is a song by Scottish musician Calvin Harris from his debut studio album, I Created Disco (2007). It was released as the album's lead single on 12 March 2007. The single peaked at number 10 on the UK Singles Chart.

Music video
The music video, directed by Woof Wan-Bau, features many references to the 1980s, including the stereotypical large hairstyles and bright dayglo colours. It also features scientists dissecting a sock puppet of what appears to be a genet, the products of which are used by a hair stylist and a TV chef, and to heal a grazed knee.

Alternate version and cover
A remix of the song with additional lyrics (retitled "Love for You"), was included as a B-side to the single.

Duran Duran partially covered the song during their 2021-2022 live dates, mixing the song's chorus with the group's own 1981 single "Girls on Film".

Track listings

Charts

Weekly charts

Year-end charts

Certifications

References

External links
 Official music video
 Audio only video

Songs about nostalgia
2007 debut singles
2006 songs
Calvin Harris songs
Columbia Records singles
Songs written by Calvin Harris